Hrebenne  (Hrebenne) is a village within Tomaszów Lubelski County, Lublin Voivodeship, in southeastern Poland.

The village has a population of 209.

References

Poland–Ukraine border crossings
Villages in Tomaszów Lubelski County